This is a list of films released in Pakistan in 2010.

2010 was a very weak year in the history of Pakistan film industry as Twelve films were released, out of which only one, the Punjabi movie Wohti Le Key Jani Aay by veteran director Syed Noor, was declared successful, with a business of almost Rs 8 million in just two days.

Releases

May - June

September - November

See also 
 2010 in film
 2010 in Pakistan

References

External links
 Search Pakistani film - IMDB.com

2010
Lists of 2010 films by country or language
Films